The 2021 Detroit Tigers season was the team's 121st season and its 22nd at Comerica Park. This was the Tigers' first season under new manager A. J. Hinch following the sudden retirement of Ron Gardenhire on September 19, 2020. The Tigers' season began at home on April 1 against the Cleveland Indians. They sought to make the playoffs for the first time since 2014. On June 8, Comerica Park was allowed to return to operating at full seating capacity for the first time since 2019. The 2020 season was played behind closed doors due to the COVID-19 pandemic restrictions, and April and May games this year were limited to 8,000 fans.

The Tigers finished the season with a 77–85 record (third place in the AL Central division), and failed to make the playoffs for the seventh consecutive season. After beginning the season 9–24, the Tigers played over .500 the rest of the year (68–61).

Roster moves

Coaching staff
On October 30, the Tigers hired A. J. Hinch as the team's new manager. Hinch most recently held the same position for  the Houston Astros but was suspended for the 2020 season due to a sign stealing scandal that occurred in 2017 and 2018, later leading to his dismissal.
On November 6, the Tigers named Chris Fetter as pitching coach, and promoted Juan Nieves (previously pitching coach for the Triple-A Toledo Mud Hens) to assistant pitching coach for the MLB team. They also announced they would retain base coach Ramón Santiago and quality control coach Josh Paul from the 2020 staff.
On November 7, the Tigers named George Lombard as bench coach, Scott Coolbaugh as hitting coach and Chip Hale as third base coach.
On December 8, the Tigers named José Cruz Jr. assistant hitting coach.
On June 12, 2021, the Tigers named Mike Hessman as assistant hitting coach, replacing José Cruz Jr. who accepted a position as head coach for Rice University.
On July 16, 2021, the Tigers named Kimera Bartee first base coach, replacing third base coach Chip Hale who accepted a position as head coach at the University of Arizona. Current first base coach Ramon Santiago was moved to third base.

Releases
On October 27, the Tigers outrighted four players from their 40-man roster: outfielder Jorge Bonifacio and pitchers Darío Agrazal, Dereck Rodríguez and Nick Ramirez. All cleared waivers without being claimed by another team. Rodríguez signed a minor-league contract with the Colorado Rockies on November 9, 2020. Ramirez elected to pursue free agency, and was signed to a minor-league contract by the San Diego Padres on December 21, 2020. The remaining two became minor-league free agents.
 On October 28, the following Tigers players declared free agency: catcher Austin Romine, infielders Jonathan Schoop and C. J. Cron, and pitchers Jordan Zimmermann, Iván Nova and Sandy Báez. On January 23, Romine signed a one-year, $1.5 million contract with the Chicago Cubs. On January 26, Nova signed a minor-league contract with the Philadelphia Phillies. On February 15, Cron signed a minor-league contract with the Colorado Rockies organization. On February 18, Zimmermann signed a minor-league contract with the Milwaukee Brewers organization.
On November 19, the Tigers released outfielder/first baseman Brandon Dixon, who announced his intention to play in Nippon Professional Baseball. Dixon cleared waivers on November 21.
On December 7, pitcher Anthony Castro was claimed off waivers by the Toronto Blue Jays.
On December 23, catcher Eric Haase was designated for assignment. He was out-righted on January 6, 2021.
On January 5, outfielder Troy Stokes Jr. was designated for assignment. On January 12, he was claimed off waivers by the Pittsburgh Pirates and was again designated for assignment two weeks later. He cleared waivers and was outrighted to the Triple-A Indianapolis Indians.
On January 29, infielder Sergio Alcántara was designated for assignment. On February 5, he was claimed off waivers by the Chicago Cubs.
On February 5, outfielder Travis Demeritte was designated for assignment. On February 12, he was claimed off waivers by the Atlanta Braves.
On February 12, pitcher John Schreiber was designated for assignment. On February 18, he was claimed off waivers by the Boston Red Sox.
On March 26, infielder Greg Garcia was granted his release by the Tigers after exercising an opt-out clause in his contract. On April 22, Garcia signed a minor league contract with the Philadelphia Phillies.
On June 15, pitcher Beau Burrows and catcher Wilson Ramos were designated for assignment. On June 20, Ramos was released. On June 22, Burrows was claimed off waivers by the Minnesota Twins. On July 6, Ramos signed a minor-league contract with the Cleveland Indians.
On July 16, outfielder Nomar Mazara was designated for assignment. Mazara was released on July 21. On December 21, Mazara signed a minor league contract with the San Diego Padres with an invitation to spring training.
On August 14, pitcher Buck Farmer was designated for assignment. He was released on August 17. On August 21, Farmer signed a minor league contract with the Texas Rangers.
On August 27, pitcher Erasmo Ramírez was designated for assignment. He was released the next day. On March 13, 2022, Ramírez signed a minor league contract with the Washington Nationals with an invitation to spring training.

Signings
On November 20, the Tigers purchased the minor-league contracts of pitchers Joey Wentz, Matt Manning, Alex Lange and Alex Faedo, adding them to the 40-man roster.
On December 10, the Tigers claimed outfielder Akil Baddoo from the Minnesota Twins organization in the Rule 5 draft.
On December 14, the Tigers signed pitcher Ian Krol to a minor-league contract, with an invitation to spring training.
On December 23, the Tigers signed catcher Dustin Garneau to a minor-league contract, with an invitation to spring training. Garneau was released from his minor-league contract on July 15. He was then signed by the Colorado Rockies to a minor-league contract on July 22. He was traded back to the Tigers and added to the active roster on August 18.
On December 23, the Tigers signed pitcher José Ureña to a one-year, $3.25 million contract.
On January 4, the Tigers signed pitcher Locke St. John to a minor-league contract.
On January 5, the Tigers signed outfielder Robbie Grossman to a two-year, $10 million contract.
On January 7, the Tigers signed pitcher Miguel Del Pozo to a minor-league contract.
On January 12, the Tigers signed pitcher Michael Fulmer to a one-year, $3.1 million contract, avoiding arbitration.
On January 15, the Tigers agreed to one-year contracts with all remaining arbitration-eligible players, including infielders Jeimer Candelario and Niko Goodrum, outfielder JaCoby Jones, and pitchers Joe Jiménez, Buck Farmer, Matthew Boyd, Daniel Norris and José Cisnero.
On January 15, the Tigers signed international shortstops Cristian Santana to a $2.975 million contract and Abel Bastidas to a $1.175 million contract. The Tigers also signed outfielders Carlos Pelegrin and Elian Riera, pitchers Joel Baez, Rayner Castillo, and Keni Salgado, and shortstops Jensy De Leon, Yimmy Diaz and Justin Rodriguez.
On January 16, the Tigers signed pitchers Robbie Ross Jr. and Andrew Moore, first baseman Aderlin Rodríguez and infielder Yariel Gonzalez to minor-league contracts.
On January 19, the Tigers signed pitcher Erasmo Ramírez to a minor-league contract, with an invitation to spring training.
On January 29, the Tigers signed catcher Wilson Ramos to a one-year, $2 million contract.
 On February 1, the Tigers signed pitcher Derek Holland to a minor-league contract, with an invitation to spring training.
 On February 5, the Tigers re-signed second baseman Jonathan Schoop to a one-year, $4.5 million contract. On August 7, the Tigers signed Schoop to a two-year, $15 million contract extension for 2022 and 2023, with a clause allowing an opt-out after 2022.
 On February 9, the Tigers signed infielder Greg Garcia to a minor-league contract, with an invitation to spring training.
 On February 10, the Tigers signed first baseman Renato Núñez to a minor-league contract, with an invitation to spring training.
 On February 12, the Tigers signed outfielder Nomar Mazara to a one-year contract worth $1.75 million plus incentives.
 On February 19, the Tigers signed pitcher Julio Teherán to a minor-league contract with an invitation to spring training. On March 22, Teherán opted out of his minor-league deal. On March 24, Teherán was selected to the 40-man roster and signed to a one-year $3 million contract, plus a $1 million bonus if he starts 20 major league games.
On February 28, the Tigers signed pitcher Drew Hutchison to a minor-league contract.
On August 2, the Tigers claimed pitcher Nivaldo Rodríguez off waivers from the Houston Astros.

Trades
On July 30, the Tigers traded pitcher Daniel Norris to the Milwaukee Brewers in exchange for minor-league pitching prospect Reese Olson.
On August 18, the Tigers acquired catcher Dustin Garneau from the Colorado Rockies in exchange for cash considerations.

Season standings

American League Central

Record against opponents

American League Wild Card

Season highlights

Individual accomplishments

Hitting
On April 1, Miguel Cabrera became the second Tigers player to record 350 home runs and 2,000 hits with the team, following Al Kaline.
On April 4, Akil Baddoo hit a home run on the first pitch he faced as a major league player, off Aaron Civale of the Cleveland Indians. Baddoo became the ninth player in franchise history to homer in his first major league at-bat, and only the second player to do so on the first pitch, following George Vico who accomplished the feat on April 20, 1948.
On April 5, Akil Baddoo hit his first career grand slam against Randy Dobnak of the Minnesota Twins. He became the first player in franchise history to hit a home run in his first two career games and the first player in MLB history to do so from the ninth spot in the batting order.
On April 6, Akil Baddoo hit his first career walk-off hit, an RBI single off of Minnesota Twins' closer Hansel Robles. He became the first Tigers player with a walk-off hit within his first three major league games since Gabe Alvarez singled off Cubs reliever Dave Stevens on June 24, 1998. Baddoo is the first MLB player since at least 1900 with two homers, including a grand slam, and a walk-off hit in his first three games.
On April 13, Akil Baddoo recorded his fourth home run of the season. He became the first player in franchise history to post four homers and 10 RBIs within his first eight games, and the first major league player to do so since Kyle Lewis in 2019. He also became the first Tigers player, and one of six players in MLB history, to drive in a run in at least six of his first eight career games since Don Ross in 1931.
On June 1, Miguel Cabrera recorded his 400th career double with the Tigers, becoming the eighth player in franchise history to reach the milestone.
Also on June 1, Jonathan Schoop and Eric Haase became the first Tigers teammates with multiple home runs in the same game since September 2017.
On July 27, opposing catchers (Mitch Garver of the Minnesota Twins and Eric Haase of the Tigers) hit grand slams in the same game for the first time in major league history.
On August 2, Eric Haase was named American League Rookie of the Month for July. He became the first Tiger to win the award since Brennan Boesch in 2010. In July, Haase posted a .265 average and a .627 slugging percentage, with nine home runs and 29 RBI.
On August 22, Miguel Cabrera recorded his 500th career home run, becoming the 28th player in MLB history to reach the milestone, and the first player to do so as a Tiger.
On August 27, Víctor Reyes hit a pinch-hit inside-the-park home run, becoming the first MLB player to do so since Tyler Saladino on May 14, 2018, and the first Tigers player to do since Ben Oglivie on June 2, 1976.
On September 7 against the Pittsburgh Pirates, Miguel Cabrera passed Ichiro Suzuki to become the all-time MLB leader with 369 career hits in interleague play. Cabrera had two more hits in that game, then went 4-for-4 against the Pirates the next night, increasing his interleague hit total to 375.
Over a three-game stretch from September 7 to September 10, Cabrera had a hit in nine consecutive plate appearances before making an out. This marks the longest streak by a Tiger since Walt Dropo tied a major league record with hits in 12 straight plate appearances in 1952, and the longest streak by any major league player age 38 or older since Ty Cobb in 1925.
On September 20, Miguel Cabrera recorded his 1,800th career RBI, becoming the 20th player in MLB history to reach the milestone.

Pitching
On May 18, Spencer Turnbull pitched the eighth no-hitter in Tigers history against the Seattle Mariners. Turnbull became the sixth Tigers pitcher to throw a no-hitter and the first since Justin Verlander on May 7, 2011.
On June 12, the Tigers used two position players (Jake Rogers and Harold Castro) as pitchers for the first time in over 100 years in a 15–2 loss to the Chicago White Sox. The last time two position players pitched in the same game for the Tigers was September 2, 1918, when Ty Cobb and Bobby Veach both took the mound.
 On July 3, Tarik Skubal became the first Tiger rookie in franchise history to strike out 100 batters before the All-Star break.

Team accomplishments
On May 28–30, the Tigers swept the Yankees in Detroit for the first time since May 12–14, 2000.
On June 30, the Tigers swept a doubleheader in Cleveland against the Indians for the first time since September 14, 1977.
On July 28, the Tigers scored 17 runs in a game without a home run for the first time since 1961, defeating the Minnesota Twins 17–14. This also marked the first time in MLB history since 1900 that a team allowed seven home runs in a game, went homerless, and still won the game. All nine players who batted for the Tigers had a hit, run and RBI, marking the first time this has been accomplished since the California Angels in 1978.
On August 7, the Tigers defeated the Indians in Cleveland, 2–1, marking the first time the team won a road game in Cleveland when scoring two runs or fewer since September 14, 1977.

Game log

|- style="background:#bfb;"
| 1 || April 1 || Indians || 3–2 || Boyd (1–0) || Bieber (0–1) || Soto (1) || 8,000 || 1–0 || W1
|- style="background:#bfb;"
| 2 || April 3 || Indians || 5–2 || Teherán (1–0) || Plesac (0–1) || Garcia (1) || 8,000 || 2–0 || W2
|- style="background:#fbb;"
| 3 || April 4 || Indians || 3–9 || Civale (1–0) || Norris (0–1) || — || 8,000 || 2–1 || L1
|- style="background:#fbb;"
| 4 || April 5 || Twins || 6–15 || Shoemaker (1–0) || Ureña (0–1) || Dobnak (1) || 7,232 || 2–2 || L2
|- style="background:#bfb;"
| 5 || April 6 || Twins || 4–3  || Soto (1–0) || Robles (0–1) || — || 7,306 || 3–2 || W1
|- style="background:#fbb;"
| 6 || April 7 || Twins || 2–3 || Maeda (1–0) || Boyd (1–1) || Colomé (2) || 7,568 || 3–3 || L1
|- style="background:#fbb;"
| 7 || April 9 || @ Indians || 1–4 || Plesac (1–1) || Holland (0–1) || Clase (1) || 7,775 || 3–4 || L2
|- style="background:#fbb;"
| 8 || April 10 || @ Indians || 3–11 || Civale (2–0) || Skubal (0–1) || — || 7,570 || 3–5 || L3
|- style="background:#fbb;"
| 9 || April 11 || @ Indians || 2–5 || Allen (1–1) || Ureña (0–2) || Clase (2) || 6,859 || 3–6 || L4
|- style="background:#bfb;"
| 10 || April 12 || @ Astros || 6–2 || Mize (1–0) || Greinke (1–1) || — || 15,779 || 4–6 || W1
|- style="background:#bfb;"
| 11 || April 13 || @ Astros || 8–2 || Boyd (2–1) || Odorizzi (0–1) || — || 17,080 || 5–6 || W2
|- style="background:#bfb;"
| 12 || April 14 || @ Astros || 6–4 || Fulmer (1–0) || McCullers Jr. (1–1) || Garcia (2) || 14,720 || 6–6 || W3
|- style="background:#fbb;"
| 13 || April 15 || @ Athletics || 4–8 || Manaea (1–1) || Skubal (0–2) || — || 3,004 || 6–7 || L1
|- style="background:#fbb;"
| 14 || April 16 || @ Athletics || 0–3 || Montas (2–1) || Ureña (0–3) || Trivino (2) || 4,538 || 6–8 || L2
|- style="background:#fbb;"
| 15 || April 17 || @ Athletics || 0–7 || Irvin (1–2) || Mize (1–1) || — || 6,931 || 6–9 || L3
|- style="background:#fbb;"
| 16 || April 18 || @ Athletics || 2–3 || Trivino (1–0) || Soto (1–1) || — || 6,917 || 6–10 || L4
|- bgcolor="bbbbbb"
| — || April 20 || Pirates ||  colspan="9" | Postponed (inclement weather). Rescheduled to April 21.
|- style="background:#fbb;"
| 17 || April 21 || Pirates || 2–3  || Anderson (2–2) || Fulmer (1–1) || Rodríguez (2) || 7,356 || 6–11 || L5
|- style="background:#bfb;"
| 18 || April 21 || Pirates || 5–2  || Turnbull (1–0) || Yajure (0–1) || Soto (2) || 7,461 || 7–11 || W1
|- style="background:#fbb;"
| 19 || April 22 || Pirates || 2–4 || Howard (2–1) || Cisnero (0–1) || Rodríguez (3) || 7,314 || 7–12 || L1
|- style="background:#fbb;"
| 20 || April 23 || Royals || 2–6 || Minor (2–1) || Mize (1–2) || — || 8,000 || 7–13 || L2
|- style="background:#fbb;"
| 21 || April 24 || Royals || 1–2 || Singer (1–2) || Boyd (2–2) || Staumont (1) || 8,000 || 7–14 || L3
|- style="background:#fbb;"
| 22 || April 25 || Royals || 0–4 || Duffy (3–1) || Skubal (0–3) || — || 8,000 || 7–15 || L4
|- style="background:#fbb;"
| 23 || April 26 || Royals || 2–3 || Keller (2–2) || Turnbull (1–1) || Staumont (2) || 7,288 || 7–16 || L5
|- style="background:#bfb;"
| 24 || April 27 || @ White Sox || 5–2 || Ureña (1–3) || Giolito (2–2) || Soto (3) || 9,445 || 8–16 || W1
|- bgcolor="bbbbbb"
| — || April 28 || @ White Sox ||  colspan="9" | Postponed (inclement weather). Rescheduled to April 29.
|- style="background:#fbb;"
| 25 || April 29 || @ White Sox || 1–3  || Rodón (4–0) || Mize (1–3) || Hendriks (5) || 7,628 || 8–17 || L1
|- style="background:#fbb;"
| 26 || April 29 || @ White Sox || 0–11  || Cease (1–0) || Boyd (2–3) || — || 7,628 || 8–18 || L2
|- style="background:#fbb;"
| 27 || April 30 || @ Yankees || 0–10 || Cole (4–1) || Skubal (0–4) || — || 9,523 || 8–19 || L3
|-

|- style="background:#fbb;"
| 28 || May 1 || @ Yankees || 4–6 || Taillon (1–2) || Turnbull (1–2) || Chapman (5) || 10,015 || 8–20 || L4
|- style="background:#fbb;"
| 29 || May 2 || @ Yankees || 0–2 || Kluber (2–2) || Ureña (1–4) || Chapman (6) || 10,021 || 8–21 || L5
|- style="background:#fbb;"
| 30 || May 4 || @ Red Sox || 7–11 || Pivetta (4–0) || Fulmer (1–2) || Barnes (7) || 4,677 || 8–22 || L6
|- style="background:#bfb;"
| 31 || May 5 || @ Red Sox || 6–5  || Soto (2–1) || Whitlock (0–1) ||  Fulmer (1) || 4,661 || 9–22 || W1
|- style="background:#fbb;"
| 32 || May 6 || @ Red Sox || 9–12 || Andriese (1–1) || Lange (0–1) || Ottavino (1) || 4,734 || 9–23 || L1
|- style="background:#fbb;"
| 33 || May 7 || Twins || 3–7 || Shoemaker (2–3) || Skubal (0–5) || — || 7,377 || 9–24 || L2
|- style="background:#bfb;"
| 34 || May 8 || Twins || 7–3 || Fulmer (2–2) || Duffey (0–2) || — || 8,000 || 10–24 || W1
|- style="background:#bbb;"
| — || May 9 || Twins ||  colspan="9" | Postponed (inclement weather). Rescheduled to July 16.
|- style="background:#bfb;"
| 35 || May 11 || Royals || 8–7 || Soto (3–1) || Barlow (1–1) || — || 7,312 || 11–24 || W2
|- style="background:#bfb;"
| 36 || May 12 || Royals || 4–2 || Mize (2–3) || Duffy (4–3) || Soto (4) || 7,133 || 12–24 || W3
|- style="background:#bfb;"
| 37 || May 13 || Royals || 4–3 || Turnbull (2–2) || Lynch (0–2) || Fulmer (2) || 7,369 || 13–24 || W4
|- style="background:#fbb;"
| 38 || May 14 || Cubs || 2–4 || Arrieta (4–3) || Skubal (0–6) || Kimbrel (7) || 8,000 || 13–25 || L1
|- style="background:#bfb;"
| 39 || May 15 || Cubs || 9–8  || Fulmer (3–2) || Kimbrel (0–2) || — || 8,000 || 14–25 || W1
|- style="background:#fbb;"
| 40 || May 16 || Cubs || 1–5 || Hendricks (3–4) || Boyd (2–4) || — || 8,000 || 14–26 || L1
|- style="background:#bfb;"
| 41 || May 17 || @ Mariners || 4–1 || Mize (3–3) || Kikuchi (1–3) || Fulmer (3) || 7,201 || 15–26 || W1
|- style="background:#bfb;"
| 42 || May 18 || @ Mariners || 5–0 || Turnbull (3–2) || Dunn (1–2) || — || 8,883 || 16–26 || W2
|- style="background:#bfb;"
| 43 || May 19 || @ Mariners || 6–2 || Skubal (1–6) || Gilbert (0–2) || — || 8,462 || 17–26 || W3
|- style="background:#bfb;"
| 44 || May 21 || @ Royals || 7–5 || Ureña (2–4) || Zuber (0–1) || Fulmer (4) || 17,080 || 18–26 || W4
|- style="background:#fbb;"
| 45 || May 22 || @ Royals || 5–7 || Singer (2–3) || Boyd (2–5) || — || 14,226 || 18–27 || L1
|- style="background:#fbb;"
| 46 || May 23 || @ Royals || 2–3 || Zimmer (3–0) || Fulmer (3–3) || — || 15,540 || 18–28 || L2
|- style="background:#fbb;"
| 47 || May 24 || Indians || 5–6 || Mejía (1–0) || Garcia (0–1) || Clase (8) || 7,832 || 18–29 || L3
|- style="background:#fbb;"
| 48 || May 25 || Indians || 1–4 || Civale (7–1) || Skubal (1–7) || Karinchak (6) || 8,000 || 18–30 || L4
|- style="background:#bfb;"
| 49 || May 26 || Indians || 1–0 || Fulmer (4–3) || Quantrill (0–1) || Soto (5) || 7,525 || 19–30 || W1
|- style="background:#fbb;"
| 50 || May 27 || Indians || 2–5 || Bieber (5–3) || Boyd (2–6) || — || 8,000 || 19–31 || L1
|- style="background:#bfb;"
| 51 || May 28 || Yankees || 3–2  || Garcia (1–1) || Wilson (1–1) || — || 8,000 || 20–31 || W1
|- style="background:#bfb;"
| 52 || May 29 || Yankees || 6–1 || Turnbull (4–2) || García (0–2) || — || 8,000 || 21–31 || W2
|- style="background:#bfb;"
| 53 || May 30 || Yankees || 6–2 || Skubal (2–7) || King (0–2) || — || 8,000 || 22–31 || W3
|- style="background:#fbb;"
| 54 || May 31 || @ Brewers || 2–3  || Boxberger (2–1) || Cisnero (0–2) || — || 23,917 || 22–32 || L1
|-

|- style="background:#bfb;"
| 55 || June 1 || @ Brewers || 10–7 || Holland (1–1) || Lauer (1–2) || — || 12,058 || 23–32 || W1
|- style="background:#fbb;"
| 56 || June 3 || @ White Sox || 1–4 || Lynn (7–1) || Mize (3–4) ||  Hendriks (14) || 12,845 || 23–33 || L1
|- style="background:#fbb;"
| 57 || June 4 || @ White Sox || 8–9 || Hendriks (2–1) || Cisnero (0–3) || — || 21,637 || 23–34 || L2
|- style="background:#bfb;"
| 58 || June 5 || @ White Sox || 4–3 || Skubal (3–7) || Giolito (5–5) || Cisnero (1) || 21,719 || 24–34 || W1
|- style="background:#fbb;"
| 59 || June 6 || @ White Sox || 0–3 || Cease (4–2) || Ureña (2–5) || Hendriks (15) || 20,068 || 24–35 || L1
|- style="background:#bfb;"
| 60 || June 8 || Mariners || 5–3 || Boyd (3–6) || Gonzales (1–4) || Cisnero (2) || 9,081 || 25–35 || W1
|- style="background:#fbb;"
| 61 || June 9 || Mariners || 6–9  || Chargois (1–0) || Norris (0–2) || — || 9,162 || 25–36 || L1
|- style="background:#bfb;"
| 62 || June 10 || Mariners || 8–3 || Jiménez (1–0) || Sheffield (5–5) || — || 9,290 || 26–36 || W1
|- style="background:#fbb;"
| 63 || June 11 || White Sox || 4–5  || Hendriks (3–1) || Cisnero (0–4) || Bummer (2) || 14,163 || 26–37 || L1
|- style="background:#fbb;"
| 64 || June 12 || White Sox || 2–15 || Cease (5–2) || Ureña (2–6) || — || 15,913 || 26–38 || L2
|- style="background:#fbb;"
| 65 || June 13 || White Sox || 1–4 || Rodón (6–2) || Alexander (0–1) || Hendriks (17) || 14,093 || 26–39 || L3
|- style="background:#bfb;"
| 66 || June 14 || @ Royals || 10–3 || Jiménez (2–0) || Keller (6–6) || — || 11,910 || 27–39 || W1
|- style="background:#bfb;"
| 67 || June 15 || @ Royals || 4–3 || Mize (4–4) || Minor (5–4) || Soto (6) || 15,947 || 28–39 || W2
|- style="background:#bfb;"
| 68 || June 16 || @ Royals || 6–5 || Skubal (4–7) || Holland (2–2) || Fulmer (5) || 11,327 || 29–39 || W3
|- style="background:#fbb;"
| 69 || June 17 || @ Angels || 5–7 || Ohtani (3–1) || Manning (0–1) || Iglesias (12) || 30,709 || 29–40 || L1
|- style="background:#fbb;"
| 70 || June 18 || @ Angels || 3–11 || Cobb (5–2) || Ureña (2–7) || — || 22,734 || 29–41 || L2
|- style="background:#fbb;"
| 71 || June 19 || @ Angels || 3–8 || Sandoval (2–2) || Peralta (0–1) || — || 23,175 || 29–42 || L3
|- style="background:#bfb;"
| 72 || June 20 || @ Angels || 5–3  || Cisnero (1–4) || Iglesias (4–3) || Fulmer (6) || 21,626 || 30–42 || W1
|- style="background:#bfb;"
| 73 || June 22 || Cardinals || 8–2 || Funkhouser (1–0) || Oviedo (0–3) || — || 13,492 || 31–42 || W2
|- style="background:#bfb;"
| 74 || June 23 || Cardinals || 6–2 || Manning (1–1) || Gant (4–6) || — || 13,263 || 32–42 || W3
|- style="background:#fbb;"
| 75 || June 24 || Astros || 3–12 || García (6–4) || Ureña (2–8) || — || 12,656 || 32–43 || L1
|- style="background:#bbb;"
| — || June 25 || Astros ||  colspan="9" | Postponed (inclement weather). Rescheduled to June 26.
|- style="background:#bfb;"
| 76 || June 26 || Astros || 3–1  || Mize (5–4) || Valdez (4–1) || Cisnero (3) || 12,422 || 33–43 || W1
|- style="background:#fbb;"
| 77 || June 26 || Astros || 2–3  || McCullers Jr. (5–1) || Fulmer (4–4) || Pressly (12) || 13,950 || 33–44 || L1
|- style="background:#bfb;"
| 78 || June 27 || Astros || 2–1  || Soto (4–1) || Taylor (0–2) || — || 13,532 || 34–44 || W1
|- style="background:#fbb;"
| 79 || June 28 || @ Indians || 5–13 || Morgan (1–2) || Manning (1–2) || — || 13,128 || 34–45 || L1
|- style="background:#bbb;"
| — || June 29 || @ Indians || colspan="9" | Postponed (inclement weather). Rescheduled to June 30.
|- style="background:#bfb;"
| 80 || June 30 || @ Indians || 9–4  || Funkhouser (2–0) || Shaw (2–3) || — || 11,627 || 35–45 || W1
|- style="background:#bfb;"
| 81 || June 30 || @ Indians || 7–1  || Peralta (1–1) || Allen (1–5) || — || 11,627 || 36–45 || W2
|-

|- style="background:#fbb;"
| 82 || July 2 || White Sox || 2–8 || Lynn (8–3) || Mize (5–5) || — || 18,185 || 36–46 || L1
|- style="background:#bfb;"
| 83 || July 3 || White Sox || 11–5 || Skubal (5–7) || Keuchel (6–3) || — || 17,230 || 37–46 || W1
|- style="background:#bfb;"
| 84 || July 4 || White Sox || 6–5 || Alexander (1–1) || Giolito (6–6) || Cisnero (4) || 15,342 || 38–46 || W2
|- style="background:#bfb;"
| 85 || July 5 || @ Rangers || 7–3 || Peralta (2–1) || Allard (2–5) || — || 34,484 || 39–46 || W3
|- style="background:#fbb;"
| 86 || July 6 || @ Rangers || 5–10 || King (7–5) || Norris (0–3) || — || 24,367 || 39–47 || L1
|- style="background:#bfb;"
| 87 || July 7 || @ Rangers || 5–3 || Funkhouser (3–0) || Gibson (6–1) || Soto (7) || 33,043 || 40–47 || W1
|- style="background:#fbb;"
| 88 || July 8 || @ Twins || 3–5 || Happ (5–4) || Skubal (5–8) || Rogers (8) || 18,192 || 40–48 || L1
|- style="background:#fbb;"
| 89 || July 9 || @ Twins || 2–4 || Alcalá (2–3) || Manning (1–3) || Robles (9) || 21,725 || 40–49 || L2
|- style="background:#fbb;"
| 90 || July 10 || @ Twins || 4–9 || Coulombe (1–0) || Jiménez (2–1) || — || 21,030 || 40–50 || L3
|- style="background:#fbb;"
| 91 || July 11 || @ Twins || 9–12  || Duffey (1–2) || Holland (1–2) || — || 20,744 || 40–51 || L4
|- style="text-align:center; background:#bbcaff;"
| colspan="10" | 2021 Major League Baseball All-Star Game
|- style="background:#bbb;"
| — || July 16 || Twins || colspan="9" | Postponed (inclement weather). Rescheduled to July 17.
|- style="background:#bbb;"
| — || July 16 || Twins || colspan="9" | Postponed (inclement weather). Rescheduled to August 30.
|- style="background:#bfb;"
| 92 || July 17 || Twins || 1–0  || Norris (1–3) || Barnes (0–1) || Soto (8) || 13,747 || 41–51 || W1
|- style="background:#bfb;"
| 93 || July 17 || Twins || 5–4  || Jiménez (3–1) || Rogers (2–4) || — || 31,624 || 42–51 || W2
|- style="background:#bfb;"
| 94 || July 18 || Twins || 7–0 || Peralta (3–1) || Happ (5–5) || — || 15,854 || 43–51 || W3
|- style="background:#bfb;"
| 95 || July 19 || Rangers || 14–0 || Jiménez (4–1) || Gibson (6–2) || — || 13,704 || 44–51 || W4
|- style="background:#bfb;"
| 96 || July 20 || Rangers || 4–1 || Skubal (6–8) || Dunning (3–7) || Soto (9) || 13,333 || 45–51 || W5
|- style="background:#bfb;"
| 97 || July 21 || Rangers || 4–2 || Manning (2–3) || Lyles (5–7) || Soto (10) || 21,132 || 46–51 || W6
|- style="background:#bfb;"
| 98 || July 22 || Rangers || 7–5 || Funkhouser (4–0) || Foltynewicz (2–10) || Soto (11) || 16,033 || 47–51 || W7
|- style="background:#fbb;"
| 99 || July 23 || @ Royals || 3–5 || Bubic (3–4) || Peralta (3–2) || Holland (7) || 24,912 || 47–52 || L1
|- style="background:#fbb;"
| 100 || July 24 || @ Royals || 8–9 || Brentz (3–2) || Funkhouser (4–1) || Davis (2) || 24,616 || 47–53 || L2
|- style="background:#fbb;"
| 101 || July 25 || @ Royals || 1–6 || Lynch (1–2) || Skubal (6–9) || — || 12,703 || 47–54 || L3
|- style="background:#fbb;"
| 102 || July 26 || @ Twins || 5–6  || Thielbar (3–0) || Soto (4–2) || — || 17,713 || 47–55 || L4
|- style="background:#bfb;"
| 103 || July 27 || @ Twins || 6–5  || Cisnero (2–4) || Alcalá (2–5) || Norris (1) || 17,643 || 48–55 || W1
|- style="background:#bfb;"
| 104 || July 28 || @ Twins || 17–14 || Holland (2–2) || Happ (5–6) || — || 17,817 || 49–55 || W2
|- style="background:#bfb;"
| 105 || July 29 || Orioles || 6–2 || Mize (6–5) || Wells (1–1) || — || 15,833 || 50–55 || W3
|- style="background:#fbb;"
| 106 || July 30 || Orioles || 3–4 || Harvey (6–10) || Skubal (6–10) || Sulser (4) || 18,861 || 50–56 || L1
|- style="background:#fbb;"
| 107 || July 31 || Orioles || 2–5 || Means (5–3) || Manning (2–4) || Sulser (5) || 25,132 || 50–57 || L2
|-

|- style="background:#bfb;"
| 108 || August 1 || Orioles || 6–2 || Ramírez (1–0) || Watkins (2–2) || — || 17,134 || 51–57 || W1
|- style="background:#bfb;"
| 109 || August 3 || Red Sox || 4–2 || Funkhouser (5–1) || Richards (6–7) || Soto (12) || 15,724 || 52–57 || W2
|- style="background:#fbb;"
| 110 || August 4 || Red Sox || 1–4 || Rodríguez (8–6) || Mize (6–6) || Barnes (24) || 16,633 || 52–58 || L1
|- style="background:#bfb;"
| 111 || August 5 || Red Sox || 8–1 || Skubal (7–10) || Pérez (7–8) || — || 19,144 || 53–58 || W1
|- style="background:#fbb;"
| 112 || August 6 || @ Indians || 1–6 || Quantrill (3–2) || Manning (2–5) || Clase (15) || 24,485 || 53–59 || L1
|- style="background:#bfb;"
| 113 || August 7 || @ Indians || 2–1 || Alexander (2–1) || Morgan (1–4) || Soto (13) || 24,560 || 54–59 || W1
|- style="background:#fbb;"
| 114 || August 8 || @ Indians || 5–7 || Shaw (5–5) || Ramírez (1–1) || Clase (16) || 19,899 || 54–60 || L1
|- style="background:#bfb;"
| 115 || August 10 || @ Orioles || 9–4 || Funkhouser (6–1) || Akin (0–6) || — || 7,124 || 55–60 || W1
|- style="background:#bfb;"
| 116 || August 11 || @ Orioles || 5–2 || Skubal (8–10) || Harvey (6–11) || Soto (14) || 8,990 || 56–60 || W2
|- style="background:#bfb;"
| 117 || August 12 || @ Orioles || 6–4 || Manning (3–5) || Means (5–4) || Fulmer (7) || 8,382 || 57–60 || W3
|- style="background:#fbb;"
| 118 || August 13 || Indians || 4–7 || Plesac (7–4) || Alexander (2–2) || — || 22,107 || 57–61 || L1
|- style="background:#bfb;"
| 119 || August 14 || Indians || 6–4 || Fulmer (5–4) || Shaw (5–6) || Soto (15) || 32,845 || 58–61 || W1
|- style="background:#fbb;"
| 120 || August 15 || Indians || 0–11 || McKenzie (2–5) || Hutchison (0–1) || — || 25,684 || 58–62 || L1
|- style="background:#fbb;"
| 121 || August 17 || Angels || 2–8 || Mayers (3–4) || Soto (4–3) || — || 24,714 || 58–63 || L2
|- style="background:#fbb;"
| 122 || August 18 || Angels || 1–3 || Ohtani (8–1) || Skubal (8–11) || Iglesias (27) || 27,284 || 58–64 || L3
|- style="background:#fbb;"
| 123 || August 19 || Angels || 10–13 || Mayers (4–4) || Fulmer (5–5) || Warren (1) || 20,847 || 58–65 || L4
|- style="background:#bfb;"
| 124 || August 20 || @ Blue Jays || 4–1  || Soto (5–3) || Richards (5–2) || — || 14,649 || 59–65 || W1
|- style="background:#fbb;"
| 125 || August 21 || @ Blue Jays || 0–3 || Ryu (12–6) || Peralta (3–3) || Romano (11) || 14,887 || 59–66 || L1
|- style="background:#bfb;"
| 126 || August 22 || @ Blue Jays || 5–3  || Soto (6–3) || Snead (0–1) || Jiménez (1) || 14,865 || 60–66 || W1
|- style="background:#bfb;"
| 127 || August 24 || @ Cardinals || 4–3 || Mize (7–6) || Flaherty (9–2) || Fulmer (8) || 28,185 || 61–66 || W2
|- style="background:#fbb;"
| 128 || August 25 || @ Cardinals || 2–3  || McFarland (3–0) || Fulmer (5–6) || — || 24,304 || 61–67 || L1
|- style="background:#bfb;"
| 129 || August 27 || Blue Jays || 2–1 || Cisnero (3–4) || Mayza (4–2) || Soto (16) || 17,259 || 62–67 || W1
|- style="background:#fbb;"
| 130 || August 28 || Blue Jays || 2–3  || Romano (6–1) || Funkhouser (6–2) || — || 18,783 || 62–68 || L1
|- style="background:#fbb;"
| 131 || August 29 || Blue Jays || 1–2 || Berríos (9–7) || Boyd (3–7) || Mayza (1) || 15,926 || 62–69 || L2
|- style="background:#fbb;"
| 132 || August 30 || Twins || 2–3 || Ober (2–2) || Mize (7–7) || Colomé (10) || 13,425 || 62–70 || L3
|- style="background:#fbb;"
| 133 || August 31 || Athletics || 3–9 || Guerra (3–1) || Skubal (8–12) || — || 13,853 || 62–71 || L4
|-

|- style="background:#bfb;"
| 134 || September 1 || Athletics || 8–6 || Jiménez (5–1) || Puk (0–2) || Soto (17) || 12,593 || 63–71 || W1
|- style="background:#fbb;"
| 135 || September 2 || Athletics || 6–8 || Montas (11–9) || Manning (3–6) || Romo (2) || 11,623 || 63–72 || L1
|- style="background:#bfb;"
| 136 || September 3 || @ Reds || 15–5 || Holland (3–2) || Gutiérrez (9–6) || — || 19,430 || 64–72 || W1
|- style="background:#fbb;"
| 137 || September 4 || @ Reds || 4–7 || Mahle (11–5) || Boyd (3–8) || Givens (5) || 26,962 || 64–73 || L1
|- style="background:#bfb;"
| 138 || September 5 || @ Reds || 4–1 || Ureña (3–8) || Castillo (7–15) || Soto (18) || 23,083 || 65–73 || W1
|- style="background:#fbb;"
| 139 || September 6 || @ Pirates || 3–6 || Shreve (3–1) || Funkhouser (6–3) || Bednar (3) || 11,141 || 65–74 || L1
|- style="background:#fbb;"
| 140 || September 7 || @ Pirates || 2–3 || Howard (3–4) || Lange (0–2) || Stratton (3) || 8,329 || 65–75 || L2
|- style="background:#bfb;"
| 141 || September 8 || @ Pirates || 5–1 || Hutchison (1–1) || Keller (4–11) || — || 8,382 || 66–75 || W1
|- style="background:#bfb;"
| 142 || September 10 || Rays || 10–4 || Cisnero (4–4) || Fairbanks (3–6) || — || 18,321 || 67–75 || W2
|- style="background:#fbb;"
| 143 || September 11 || Rays || 2–7 || Enns (1–0) || Mize (7–8) || — || 18,842 || 67–76 || L1
|- style="background:#bfb;"
| 144 || September 12 || Rays || 8–7  || Funkhouser (7–3) || Feyereisen (4–4) || — || 13,396 || 68–76 || W1
|- style="background:#bfb;"
| 145 || September 14 || Brewers || 1–0  || Garcia (2–1) || Strickland (3–2) || — || 12,433 || 69–76 || W2
|- style="background:#bfb;"
| 146 || September 15 || Brewers || 4–1 || Manning (4–6) || Woodruff (9–9) || Fulmer (9) || 11,321 || 70–76 || W3
|- style="background:#fbb;"
| 147 || September 16 || @ Rays || 2–5 || Enns (2–0) || Alexander (2–3) || — || 10,206 || 70–77 || L1
|- style="background:#fbb;"
| 148 || September 17 || @ Rays || 4–7  || Kittredge (9–3) || Garcia (2–2) || — || 16,451 || 70–78 || L2
|- style="background:#bfb;"
| 149 || September 18 || @ Rays || 4–3 || Ureña (4–8) || Yarbrough (8–6) || Fulmer (10) || 22,921 || 71–78 || W1
|- style="background:#bfb;"
| 150 || September 19 || @ Rays || 2–0 || Peralta (4–3) || McClanahan (9–6) || Funkhouser (1) || 17,948 || 72–78 || W2
|- style="background:#bfb;"
| 151 || September 20 || White Sox || 4–3 || Hutchison (2–1) || Kimbrel (4–5) || Lange (1) || 12,884 || 73–78 || W3
|- style="background:#bfb;"
| 152 || September 21 || White Sox || 5–3 || Garcia (3–2) || Fry (0–1) || Fulmer (11) || 10,585 || 74–78 || W4
|- style="background:#bbb;"
| — || September 22 || White Sox ||  colspan="9" | Postponed (inclement weather). Rescheduled to September 27.
|- style="background:#fbb;"
| 153 || September 24 || Royals || 1–3 || Tapia (4–0) || Lange (0–3) || Barlow (15) || 24,877 || 74–79 || L1
|- style="background:#bfb;"
| 154 || September 25 || Royals || 5–1 || Hutchison (3–1) || Tapia (4–1) || Fulmer (12) || 16,424 || 75–79 || W1
|- style="background:#fbb;"
| 155 || September 26 || Royals || 1–2 || Bubic (6–6) || Peralta (4–4) || Barlow (16) || 23,788 || 75–80 || L1
|- style="background:#fbb;"
| 156 || September 27 || White Sox || 7–8 || Keuchel (9–9) || Manning (4–7) || Hendriks (37) || 11,044 || 75–81 || L2
|- style="background:#fbb;"
| 157 || September 28 || @ Twins || 2–3 || Thielbar (7–0) || Alexander (2–4) || Colomé (17) || 16,329 || 75–82 || L3
|- style="background:#fbb;"
| 158 || September 29 || @ Twins || 2–5 || Pineda (9–8) || Mize (7–9) || — || 17,254 || 75–83 || L4
|- style="background:#bfb;"
| 159 || September 30 || @ Twins || 10–7 || Lange (1–3) || Garza Jr. (1–4) || Fulmer (13) || 21,186 || 76–83 || W1
|-

|- style="background:#fbb;"
| 160 || October 1 || @ White Sox || 1–8 || Lynn (11–6) || Peralta (4–5) || — || 30,729 || 76–84 || L1
|- style="background:#fbb;"
| 161 || October 2 || @ White Sox || 4–5 || Bummer (5–5) || Funkhouser (7–4) || Hendriks (38) || 36,320 || 76–85 || L2
|- style="background:#bfb;"
| 162 || October 3 || @ White Sox || 5–2 || Jiménez (6–1) || López (4–4) || — || 30,722 || 77–85 || W1
|-

|- style="text-align:center;"
| Legend:       = Win       = Loss       = PostponementBold = Tigers team member

Roster

Farm system

References

External links
Detroit Tigers official site

Detroit Tigers seasons
Detroit Tigers
Detroit Tigers